Neil S. Bishop (1903 – February 24, 1989) was an American dairy farmer, educator and politician from Maine.

Bishop was born in Presque Isle, Maine, although his family moved when he was young to Bowdoinham, Maine. He served four terms (1940–1948) in the Maine Senate as a Republican while a resident of Bowdoinham. He unsuccessfully sought the Republican Party nomination for governor in 1948 and 1952. After moving to Stockton Springs, he won the nomination for Congress in the 2nd district in 1958, but lost to incumbent Democrat Frank M. Coffin. For several subsequent years, he taught at Augusta's Cony High School. In his final bid for public office, Bishop was his party's nominee for U.S. Senate in 1970, which he lost to Edmund Muskie.

References

1903 births
1989 deaths
Farmers from Maine
Educators from Maine
Republican Party Maine state senators
People from Presque Isle, Maine
People from Bowdoinham, Maine
People from Waldo County, Maine
20th-century American politicians